Meloyde Blancett (born January 24, 1956) is an American politician who has served in the Oklahoma House of Representatives from the 78th district since 2016.

References

1956 births
Living people
Democratic Party members of the Oklahoma House of Representatives
21st-century American politicians
21st-century American women politicians
Politicians from Tulsa, Oklahoma
Women state legislators in Oklahoma